Umang Sharma (born 20 October 1989) is an Indian first-class cricketer who plays for Uttar Pradesh.

References

External links
 

1989 births
Living people
Indian cricketers
Uttar Pradesh cricketers
Sportspeople from Meerut
Gujarat Lions cricketers